Chloritis balatensis is a species of air-breathing land snail, a terrestrial pulmonate gastropod mollusk in the family Camaenidae.

Distribution 
The type locality for this species is described as Balante auf Celebes, in  Sulawesi, Indonesia.

Shell description 
The shell is large for the genus Chloritis. It is brown, hairless, not completely flat, umbilicated. The ends of the peristome are connected with a thin callus. The width of the shell is 40–46 mm.

The species was described from only one specimen (“ein tadellos erhaltenes Stück”), which is the holotype by monotypy, stored in the Staatliche Naturhistorische Sammlungen Dresden, Museum für Tierkunde, Dresden, Germany, number 10199.

References
This article incorporates CC-BY-3.0 text from the reference.

Camaenidae
Gastropods described in 1896